is a Japanese footballer who currently plays for Veertien Mie.

Career

Fukushima United
Kawanaka joined Fukushima United FC on 1 January 2019, after signing with the club on 8 December 2018. He was released at the end of the 2019 season.

Career statistics

Club

Notes

References

External links

1997 births
Living people
Japanese footballers
Japanese expatriate footballers
Association football midfielders
2. Liga (Austria) players
J3 League players
SV Horn players
Fukushima United FC players
Matsue City FC players
Expatriate footballers in Austria
Japanese expatriate sportspeople in Austria